Runtime, run-time, or run time may refer to:

Computing
Runtime (program lifecycle phase), the period during which a computer program is executing
 Runtime library, a program library designed to implement functions built into a programming language
 Runtime system, software designed to support the execution of computer programs
 Software execution, the process of performing instructions one by one during the runtime phase

Art and entertainment
 The duration of a film, song, or television program

See also
 
 
 
 
 Running Time (film)